The Park Centre is a retail and leisure development that was constructed in a largely built-up residential area in South-West Belfast.  The complex was constructed by Brookmount Properties Limited and opened on 15 April 1985.  Today it is currently owned and operated by Latt Limited.

Retail Stores

In recent times, The Park Centre has had a £400,000 renovation, which included an extension that expanded retail space. Currently, there are 35 shops within the centre including JD Sports, Poundland and Specsavers. The complex also has a number of anchor tenants including Peacocks, Iceland and Carphone Warehouse. The Park Centre also has a number of food outlets including a Subway and a local coffee shop.

In the spring of 2018, an investment of £3 million was announced which included the creation of a B&M Bargains and a Home Bargains superstore. B&M will move to the former Dunnes Store Food Outlet from its current unit.

History

Belfast Celtic F.C 

The grounds of The Park Centre once used to be the grounds of the Belfast Celtic F.C.  Belfast Celtic Football and Athletic Company purchased the ground in 1900 and moved onto the site, then called Celtic Park, in 1901.  While at the site, the club won a plethora of trophies and cups before exiting football in 1949, after the Windsor Park Riot of December 1948 left several players badly injured. The ground consisted of a grandstand and covered enclosure known as the Willowbank Stand.  As well as football, athletics, boxing, pony trotting and dog racing meetings were held on site.  Famously, in 1912, Winston Churchill, then a Liberal MP, addressed a 5,000 strong political meeting on the site, arguing in favour of Irish Home Rule.  Later, in the run up to the Easter Rising of 1916, Irish Volunteers drilled at Celtic Park and were inspected in 1915 by Irish Nationalist leader John Redmond.  There is now a dedicated retail unit as a museum giving information on the football club and grounds.

Sean Graham Bookmakers

In 1977, the ground was sold to Sean Graham Bookmakers Ltd who continued to run greyhound meetings at the Park, but this was unsuccessful, due to the political and economic unrest at the time.

Brookmount Properties

The 11-acre site was acquired by Brookmount Properties Limited from Belfast Sport and Leisure in 1982, and a planning permission application was submitted in 1983 to build the shopping complex.  The Park Centre opened its doors to the public in 1985. It was one of three such centres in the whole of Northern Ireland at that time.

References

External links
Park Centre

Shopping centres in Northern Ireland
Buildings and structures in Belfast
Shopping malls established in 1985
1985 establishments in Northern Ireland